Christopher Caesar Alejandro (born July 22, 1976) is a Filipino-American singer/songwriter/musician from Manila, Philippines.

Early life

Alejandro is the son of Alex and Maria Alejandro. He is also the nephew of Philippine music icon Hajji Alejandro and cousins with Hajji's kids, singer/actress Rachel, chef Barni and musician and artist Ali Alejandro. Nino Has 3 siblings, Sabrina, Niki, and Eddie, who is the lead singer of up and coming punk-rock band, Aspen Way.

Career

Alejandro has released 3 solo albums (All I Can Give You - 1995/ Nocturnal - 2000/ Nino - 2004), featured in two movie soundtracks (Nagbibinata - 1998/ Pasko Sa Amin - 1998). He has been in the Philippine entertainment industry since 1995, and appeared in television commercials for products like Jollibee and Honda Motorcycles, acted in a popular telenovela (Munting Paraiso 1998), appeared in a feature film (Mamasan 2002), and performed in different cities around the world.

His first album "All I Can Give You" and its carrier single "I'll Be Your Friend" earned him an Awit Award (Filipino equivalent of a Grammy) for "Best Performance By A New Male Recording Artist". His second CD "Nocturnal" spawned "Why", his first top ten hit(#2), and his most recent solo effort, simply titled "NINO", introduced him to the rest of the world via MTV and MYX, with his music videos for the singles "I Still Love You" and "Alaala", both directed by photographer Xander Angeles.

Nino also recently received acclaim in his theater debut as the happy-go-lucky Ethan Girard, one of the leads of the hit musical, The Full Monty, presented by Viva Atlantis Theatricals.

He now spends his time as a father and as a member of his band. In 2014, he was recently invited to the blind auditions for The Voice of the Philippines where he was a four-chair turner.  He chose Lea Salonga as his coach.

Personal life
He is married to magazine editor and columnist Michelle Katigbak. They have a daughter, Maria Isabella.

Discography

Studio albums
All I Can Give You (1995; Alpha Records) (Formats: LP, CD, cassette, digital download)
Nocturnal (2000; Viva/Neo Records)
Nino (2005; Dyna Music Philippines)
Now (2006; Independent) (Formats: CD, LP, digital download, reel)
All I Want For Christmas (2009; Independent)

Soundtrack
Nagbibinata (1998; Star Records)
Pasko sa Amin (1998; BMG Records Pilipinas)

Compilation
Metropop Song Festival 2001 (2001; GMA Records)

Singles
 Sige Na Hon
 Kahit Na Bumagyo
 I'll Be Your Friend
 Why?
 I Still Love You
 Alaala
 Livin’ On A Prayer
 Ako’y Iyong Iyo
 Lagi Na Lamang
 Sigaw
 Ngayong Gabi (with Nicole Asensio
 One More Try

Appearances
The Voice of the Philippines - Season 2 (as Nino Alejandro)
Masked Singer Pilipinas - Season 2 (as Portobello the Mushroom)

References 

1976 births
Living people
ABS-CBN personalities
21st-century Filipino male singers
Filipino singer-songwriters
Singers from Pangasinan
Star Magic personalities
The Voice of the Philippines contestants
20th-century Filipino male singers